Kenié Hydroelectric Power Station is a  hydroelectric power station under development in Mali. The power station is owned by Eranove, a French company that specializes in the supply, distribution and management of electricity and water in Africa. In June 2015, working through its subsidiary, Kenié Énergie Renouvelable (Kénié Renewable Energy), Eranove signed a 30-year concession with the Malian government, to design, finance, build, operate and maintain this power station. Kénié Renewable Energy (KRE) is co-owned by the International Finance Corporation (IFC), a component of the World Bank Group. The energy off-taker for this power station is expected to be Société Energie du Mali (EDM-SA), the Malian public utility parastatal company.

Location
The power station would be located at Baguinéda, along the Niger River, in Kati Cercle, in the Koulikoro Region of southwestern Mali.

Overview
The design calls for generation capacity of 42 megawatts, equivalent to 175 GWh in annual production, capable of supplying 175,000 Malian homes. The 30-year concession for this power station was awarded to Eranove on a build–own–operate–transfer (BOOT) arrangement. The Malian Council of Ministers approved the award in a cabinet meeting on 15 November 2018.

Ownership
Kenié Energies Revouvelables is the name of the special purpose vehicle company (SPV) that was awarded the concession contract, on behalf of Eranove, its parent company. The table below illustrates the ownership and shareholding in the SPV.

Construction costs
The construction costs were reported as €110 (US$124 million), in 2015 money.

Other considerations
In 2015 the expectation was to reach financial close in 2016, start construction after that and commission the power station in 2020, after four years of construction. Although those plans did not materialize, as of April 2022, Eranove still hopes to develop this renewable energy infrastructure project in the future.

See also

List of power stations in Mali
Kandadji Dam

References

External links
  Approximate location of Kenié Hydroelectric Power Station
 Eranove to develop 42MW hydro plant in Mali As of 22 June 2015.

Power stations in Mali
Koulikoro Region
Hydroelectric power stations in Mali
Niger River